A phantom limb is the sensation by an amputee that an amputated or missing limb is still attached to the body.

Phantom limb may also refer to:
 Phantom Limb (album), by Pig Destroyer
 Phantom Limb (band), from Bristol, England
 Phantom Limb (character), a fictional character in The Venture Bros. cartoon
 "Phantom Limb" (The Shins song), 2007
 "Phantom Limb" (Alice in Chains song), 2013
 "Phantom Limb", a song by GWAR from the album The Blood of Gods
 The Phantom Limbs, an American music band
 Phantom Limbs: Selected B-Sides, a compilation double album by Australian band Something for Kate